Lindswell, also known as Lindswell Kwok (Chinese: 郭利娟; pinyin: Guō Lìjuān, born 24 September 1991) is an Indonesian former  taijiquan athlete. She is one of the most renowned wushu taolu athletes of all time. In 2013, she was named Best Athlete by the Indonesian Olympic Committee, and received the Dharma Sports Medal, the highest sports award in Indonesia. For her achievements, Indonesian media dubbed her as the "queen of wushu".

Career

Junior career 
Kwok began practicing wushu in 1999, following her brother Iwan. She won a silver medal in the Indonesian Junior National Competition in 2005 and a gold medal in the following year. In 2006, she competed at the first World Junior Wushu Championships (WJWC) in Kuala Lumpur, Malaysia, and won the bronze medal in taijijian. A year later, she debuted at the 2007 World Wushu Championships in Beijing, China, and placed fourth in taijiquan. She then represented North Sumatra at the 2008 National Games and won a silver medal. Due to her high placement at the world championships from the previous year, she was also able to compete in the 2008 Beijing Wushu Tournament where she placed sixth in the women's taijiquan combined event. Also in 2008, she competed at the second World Junior Wushu Championships in Bali, Indonesia, where she won the gold medal in taijiquan.

2009-2013 
Lindswell competed at the 2009 World Wushu Championships in Toronto, Canada, and won a gold medal in taijiquan and a bronze medal in taijijian. In her first event of taijiquan, Lindswell tied Japan's Ai Myaoka with a score of 9.80, but was able to win due to tie-breaking procedures regarding B-score. In her second event of taijijian, she received a score of 9.74. Shortly after, she then competed in the 2009 Southeast Asian Games in Vientiane, Laos, and won the silver medal in the taijiquan and taijijian combined event under Chai Fong Ying.

In 2010 at the first rendition of the World Combat Games in Beijing, China, she won the gold medal in the taijiquan and taijiquan combined event. A few months later, she competed in women’s taijiquan the 2010 Asian Games. During the first round of competition which consisted of taijijian, Lindswell was in a three-way tie for first with Malaysia’s Chai Fong Ying and Japan’s Ai Miyaoka whom all scored 9.67. In the second round of taijiquan, Lindswell received a low score of 9.43 due to some deductions and placed sixth overall in the event with a score of 19.10.

At the 2011 World Wushu Championships in Ankara, Turkey, Lindswell won a silver medal in taijiquan and a bronze medal in taijijian. A month later, Lindswell competed at the 2011 Southeast Asian Games in Jakarta, Indonesia. She won the gold medal in the taijiquan and taijijian combined event with a combined score of 19.47.

Lindswell's next major appearance was at the 2013 World Games in Cali, Colombia, and won the gold medal in the taijiquan and taijijian combined event. Around two months later, she competed in the 2013 Islamic Solidarity Games, and won gold medals in the taijiquan and taijijian events. Half a month later, she competed in the 2013 World Combat Games in St. Petersburg, Russia, and won once again in the taijiquan combined event, thus making her the only wushu athlete to win two gold medals at the World Combat Games. Two weeks later, she competed in the 2013 World Wushu Championships in Kuala Lumpur, Malaysia, and won a gold medal in taijijian and a silver medal in taijiquan. Around a month later, she competed in the 2013 Southeast Asian Games in Naypyidaw, Myanmar and won again in the taijiquan and taijijian combined event.

2014-2018 
In women’s taijiquan at the 2014 Asian Games in Incheon, South Korea, Lindswell steadily held her second place position during both rounds and thus was able to win the silver medal slightly above Japan’s Ai Uchida and under China’s Yu Mengmeng. Over a month later, she competed in the first rendition of the World Taijiquan Championships in Dujiangyang, China, and won a won a gold and a bronze medal in Yang-style taijiquan and taijijian respectively.

The following year, Lindswell first competed at the 2015 Southeast Asian Games held in Singapore. The taijiquan and taijijian events were reformed into two separate events, and Lindswell was able to win gold medals in each event. Four months later at the 2015 World Wushu Championships in Jakarta, Indonesia, she was a double gold medalist in her usual events.

A year later, Lindswell returned to the World Taijiquan Championships in 2016 which were held in Warsaw, Poland, and she was a double gold medalist in yang style taijiquan and taijijian.

At the 2017 Southeast Asian Games in Kuala Lumpur, Malaysia, she only competed and won in taijijian, as the taijiquan event was modified to be a compulsory routine event. At the 2017 World Wushu Championships in Kazan, Russia, despite placing twelfth in the taijijian event, she won the gold medal in taijiquan, her fifth gold medal. With this achievement, she firmly established herself as the most renowned taijiquan athlete at the world championships.

In women’s taijiquan at the 2018 Asian Games in Jakarta, Indonesia, Lindswell established her dominance over the competition and won the gold medal by consistently scoring 9.75 in both of her events. The President of Indonesia, Joko Widodo, witnessed her victory and refereed to her as the "queen of Asia." After her victory, Lindswell announced her formal retirement from competition, citing knee injuries as her main reason.

Personal life 
Her brother, Iwan Kwok, became a secretary and a coach of the Indonesian Wushu Federation.

In 2015, Lindswell, originally a practitioner of Buddhism, started studying Islam after watching one of her teammates pray. After the 2018 Asian Games, she officially converted to Islam and on December 9, 2018, in the absence of her family, she married her former wushu teammate Achmad Hulaefi. Their son, Achmad Zubayr, was born on January 10, 2020. In 2022, she gave birth to a son, Achmad Miqdad.

Awards 
By the Republic Of Indonesia

 Dharma Sports Medal (2013)

Indonesian Sport Awards

 Favorite Female Athlete (2018)

See also 

 List of Asian Games medalists in wushu

References

External links 

 Lindswell Kwok at the 2018 Asian Games
 
 Lindswell Kwok on YouTube

1991 births
Living people
People from Binjai
Sportspeople from North Sumatra
Indonesian people of Chinese descent
Indonesian sportspeople of Chinese descent
Indonesian Cantonese people
Converts to Islam from Buddhism
Indonesian Muslims
Indonesian wushu practitioners
Tai chi practitioners
Competitors at the 2013 World Games
World Games medalists in wushu
World Games gold medalists
Wushu practitioners at the 2010 Asian Games
Wushu practitioners at the 2014 Asian Games
Wushu practitioners at the 2018 Asian Games
Asian Games gold medalists for Indonesia
Asian Games silver medalists for Indonesia
Asian Games medalists in wushu
Medalists at the 2014 Asian Games
Medalists at the 2018 Asian Games
Competitors at the 2009 Southeast Asian Games
Competitors at the 2011 Southeast Asian Games
Competitors at the 2013 Southeast Asian Games
Competitors at the 2015 Southeast Asian Games
Competitors at the 2017 Southeast Asian Games
Southeast Asian Games gold medalists for Indonesia
Southeast Asian Games silver medalists for Indonesia
Southeast Asian Games medalists in wushu
Competitors at the 2008 Beijing Wushu Tournament
Islamic Solidarity Games competitors for Indonesia
20th-century Indonesian women
21st-century Indonesian women